KLXY may refer to:

 KLXY (FM), radio station (90.5 FM) in Woodlake, California
 KJAG, a radio station (107.7 FM) in Guthrie, Texas, which held the call sign KLXY from 2017 to 2018
 KARW, a radio station (97.9 FM) in Salinas, California, which held the call sign KLXY from 2016 to 2017